Norman Buel Judd (January 10, 1815 – November 11, 1878) was a U.S. Representative from Illinois, and the grandfather of U.S. Representative Norman Judd Gould of New York.

Born January 10, 1815, in Rome, New York, son of Norman Judd and Catherine Van der Heyden. He received a liberal schooling. He studied law. He was admitted to the bar in 1836 and commenced practice in his hometown. He moved to Chicago, Illinois, in 1836 and continued the practice of his profession. He served as city attorney 1837–1839. He served as a member of the Illinois Senate from 1844 to 1860. He served as delegate to the 1860 Republican National Convention. He was appointed Minister Plenipotentiary to the Kingdom of Prussia by President Abraham Lincoln on March 6, 1861, and served until 1865.

Judd was elected as a Republican to the Fortieth and Forty-first Congresses (March 4, 1867 – March 3, 1871). He declined to be a candidate for reelection in 1870. He was appointed collector at the port of Chicago by President Ulysses S. Grant on December 5, 1872, and served until his death.

He married Adaline Rossiter on November 27, 1844, in Cook County, Illinois.  She was the daughter of Newton Rossiter and Maria Gilbert. She was born February 11, 1821, in Torrington, Connecticut, and died December 19, 1904, in Seneca Falls, New York.  They had five children: Frank Rossiter, Norman Rossiter, Julia Seammon, Mary Mitchell and Edward James Judd.

Norman Judd died November 11, 1878, in Chicago, Illinois at age 63. He was interred in Graceland Cemetery.

References

External links

Republican Party Illinois state senators
Politicians from Chicago
Politicians from Rome, New York
Burials at Graceland Cemetery (Chicago)
1815 births
1878 deaths
19th-century American diplomats
Republican Party members of the United States House of Representatives from Illinois
Ambassadors of the United States to Prussia
19th-century American politicians
Chicago City Council members